Ravichandran Samanna (born 16 April 1956), known professionally as Nizhalgal Ravi, is an Indian film, television and voice actor who works mainly in Tamil cinema. He has performed in Tamil, Malayalam and Telugu films and television series. He started his career in 1980 with the film Nizhalgal. He has acted in 550 films. He is best known for his dubbing work for Amitabh Bachchan in Tamil.

Career
Nizhalgal Ravi started his career under the team of veteran director Bharathiraja in the Tamil film Nizhalgal (1980), which fetched him his sobriquet Nizhalgal. He has played many impressive roles in blockbuster movies like Chinna Thambi Periya Thambi (1987), Nayakan (1987), Vedham Pudhithu (1987), etc. His versatility has won him praises from all over the industry and from people. He has acted in over 20 movies in Malayalam in the 80s before moving into mainstream Tamil movies.  He paired with several leading actress Raadhika, Radha, Gautami, Khushbu, Ramya Krishnan, Revathi, Urvashi, Bhanupriya, Amala, Ranjini, Seetha, Kanaka, Saranya Ponvannan, Kasthuri, Rohini.

He completed his Bachelor of Arts majoring in economics from PSG Arts College. He then acted in K. Balachander’s telefilm Rail Sneham in the late 80s and 90s. He became popular through this opportunity and went on to act in the same director's TV serial Jannal. He then went on to play the caring husband, evil villain, second hero, etc. in many movies and even comedian at times. His notable films include Indian (1996) where he played a corrupt official, Kushi (2000), Budget Padmanabhan (2000), Citizen (2001), Attahasam (2004), Thaamirabharani (2007), Dhaam Dhoom (2008), Singam (2010), Kaavalan (2011), Aadu Puli (2011), Osthe (2011), Vanakkam Chennai (2013), etc. He is also a seasoned voice artist having dubbed for many actors.

Notable filmography

Film

 Nizhalgal (1980)
 Kakka (Movie) (1982)
 Sri Raghavendrar (1985)
 Chinna Thambi Periya Thambi (1987)
 Veendum Lisa (1987)
 Nayakan (1987)
 Vedham Pudhithu (1987)
 Mappillai (1989)
 Nyaya Tharasu (1989)
 Adhisaya Manithan (1990)
 My Dear Marthandan (1990)
 Dharma Durai (1991)
 Annamalai (1992)
 Singaravelan (1992)
 Marupadiyum (1993)
 Aasai (1995)
 Kuruthipunal (1995)
 Naan Petha Magane (1995)
 Indian (1996)
 Arunachalam (1997)
 Suryavamsam (1997)
 Bharathi (2000)
 Kushi (2000)
 Puthira Punithama (2000)
 Budget Padmanabhan (2000)
 Citizen (2001)
 Villain (2002)
 Thirumalai (2003)
 Singam (2010)
 Melvilasom (2011)
 Venghai  (2011)
 "Vanakkam Chennai" (2013)
 Singam II (2013)
 Ratsasan (2018)
 Ponniyin Selvan (2022)

As voice actor

Television

Web series

References

External links
 

Indian male voice actors
Tamil male actors
Living people
Indian male film actors
Indian male television actors
Male actors in Tamil cinema
1956 births